The Alexander McNish House (also known as the McNish-Musser House) is a historic house located at 194 County Road 30 in Salem, Washington County, New York.

Description and history 
It was built about 1794, and is a two-story, five bay by three bay, brick dwelling with a gambrel roof and dormers. It is representative of the Georgian style. It has a one-story frame addition and a connected former carriage house. Also on the property is a contributing timber frame barn (c. 1850).

It was added to the National Register of Historic Places on November 29, 2010.

References

Houses completed in 1794
Houses on the National Register of Historic Places in New York (state)
Georgian architecture in New York (state)
Houses in Washington County, New York
National Register of Historic Places in Washington County, New York
1794 establishments in New York (state)